Epideira tuberculata is a species of sea snail, a marine gastropod mollusk in the family Horaiclavidae.

Description

Distribution
This marine species is endemic to Australia and occurs off New South Wales and Queensland.

References

 Laseron, C. F. (1954). Revision of the New South Wales Turridae. Royal Zoological Society of New South Wales Australian Zoological Handbook. Sydney: Royal Zoological Society of New South Wales. 56 pp., 12 pls
 Taylor, J.D., Kantor, Y.I. & Sysoev, A.V. 1993. Foregut anatomy, feeding mechanisms, relationships and classification of the Conoidea (=Toxoglossa) (Gastropoda). Bulletin of the British Museum (Natural History) Zoology 59: 125–170 
 Wilson, B. 1994. Australian marine shells. Prosobranch gastropods. Kallaroo, WA : Odyssey Publishing Vol. 2 370 pp.
 Tucker, J.K. 2004. Catalog of Recent and fossil turrids (Mollusca: Gastropoda). Zootaxa 682: 1–1295

External links
 Beechey, D. 2004. Epidirona tuberculata Laseron, 1954

tuberculata
Gastropods described in 1954
Gastropods of Australia